Vladas Terleckas (born September 13, 1939) is a Lithuanian politician.  In 1990 he was among those who signed the Act of the Re-Establishment of the State of Lithuania.

He has also been active as a writer.

References

1939 births
Living people
Lithuanian politicians
Lithuanian writers
Place of birth missing (living people)